Prospect Hill orthohantavirus is a single-stranded, negative-sense Hantaan-like zoonotic RNA virus isolated from meadow voles and microtine and other cricetid rodents in the United States. It has a widespread distribution in Pennsylvania, Maryland, West Virginia, Minnesota and California. The overall risk of infection in humans is low. It was first isolated from a meadow vole found in Prospect Hill, Maryland for which it is named.

Transmission 
Transmission to humans is believed to occur through aerosolized inhalation of mouse excreta and possibly through fomite contamination.

See also 
 Isla Vista virus
 Hantaan River virus
 Bloodland Lake virus

References

External links 
 Sloan Science and Film / Short Films / Muerto Canyon by Jen Peel 29 minutes
 "Hantaviruses, with emphasis on Four Corners Hantavirus" by Brian Hjelle, M.D., Department of Pathology, School of Medicine, University of New Mexico
 CDC's Hantavirus Technical Information Index page
 Viralzone: Hantavirus
 Virus Pathogen Database and Analysis Resource (ViPR): Bunyaviridae
 Occurrences and deaths in North and South America

Viral diseases
Hantaviridae
Rodent-carried diseases